William Owen Goodman (1848–1936) was an American lumber tycoon.  He was born in Wellsboro, Pennsylvania to Owen and Susan (Barber) Goodman in 1848.  His parents died at an early age and he was raised by various members of his family living in different areas throughout Pennsylvania, such as Columbia and Athens.  He moved to Chicago at the age of 20 in 1868.  He first worked as a bookkeeper and then a salesman for the Menominee River Lumber Company.  He began investing in lumber on his own.  In 1878 he married Erna Sawyer and, with his new brother-in-law, formed the Sawyer-Goodman Company, of which he eventually became president. 

Goodman is famous for helping to found the Goodman Theatre through a gift of $250,000 made to Art Institute of Chicago.  The donation was made in memory of his son Kenneth Sawyer Goodman, a playwright who died at the age of 35 during the 1918 flu pandemic.  His son had written and produced a number of different plays throughout Chicago and had envisioned a theater which embraced the best professional training and performance standards.

He is also notable for employing architect Howard Van Doren Shaw to build both a tomb memorializing his son  as well as his mansion in the expensive Gold Coast District.  His former residence is on Astor Street, which was given landmark status in 1975 by then mayor Richard J. Daley.

References

External links
 Goodman Family Papers at The Newberry Library

1848 births
1936 deaths
American businesspeople
American patrons of the arts
People from Wellsboro, Pennsylvania